WRFU-LP (104.5 FM, "Radio Free Urbana") is a radio station broadcasting a variety music format. Licensed to Urbana, Illinois, United States, the station serves the Champaign area. The station is currently owned by the Urbana-Champaign Independent Media Center Foundation.

References

External links
 
 

RFU-LP
RFU-LP
Urbana, Illinois